Myrionora is a genus of fungi in the  family Lecanoraceae.

References

Lecanoraceae
Lecanorales genera
Lichen genera